Arthur Bassett (28 June 1914 – 30 December 1999) was a Welsh dual-code international rugby union, and professional rugby league footballer who played in the 1930s and 1940s. He played representative level rugby union (RU) for Wales, and at club level for Maesteg, Neath, Glamorgan Police RFC, Aberavon RFC, Cardiff, switching to professional rugby football in 1939.

Background
Arthur Bassett was born in Kenfig Hill, Wales, he was the younger brother of the international rugby union footballer; Jack Bassett, and he died aged 85 in Matlock, Derbyshire.

Playing career

International honours
Arthur Bassett won caps for Wales (RU) in 1934 against England, in 1935 against England, Scotland, and Ireland, and in 1938 against England, and Scotland, won caps for Wales (RL) while at Halifax 1939...1946 3-caps, and won caps for Great Britain (RL) while at Halifax in 1946 against Australia (2 matches). He scored a hat-trick of tries in Great Britain's victory over Australia at Brisbane in 1946

Challenge Cup Final appearances
Arthur Bassett played  in Halifax's 2–9 defeat by Leeds in the 1940–41 Challenge Cup Final during the 1940–41 season at Odsal, Bradford, in front of a crowd of 28,500.

Honoured at Halifax
Arthur Bassett is a Halifax Hall of Fame Inductee.

References

External links
!Great Britain Statistics at englandrl.co.uk (statistics currently missing due to not having appeared for both Great Britain, and England)
Cardiff RFC Season Review 1938 – 1939
Image – Arthur Bassett

1914 births
1999 deaths
Aberavon RFC players
Cardiff RFC players
Dual-code rugby internationals
Glamorgan Police RFC players
Great Britain national rugby league team players
Halifax R.L.F.C. players
Kenfig Hill RFC players
Maesteg RFC players
Neath RFC players
Rugby league players from Bridgend County Borough
Rugby league wingers
Rugby union players from Kenfig Hill
Wales international rugby union players
Wales national rugby league team players
Welsh police officers
Welsh rugby league players
Welsh rugby union players
York Wasps players
Glamorgan Police officers